Liuji is a town under the administration of Dengzhou City in southwestern Henan province, China, located less than  north of the border with Hubei and  south-southeast of downtown Dengzhou.

See also 
 List of township-level divisions of Henan

References 

Towns in Nanyang, Henan
Dengzhou